"I'll Follow You" is the fourth single from American rock band Shinedown's fourth studio album, Amaryllis.

Release
The song was released on February 5, 2013.

Track listing

Music videos
The official video premiered on the band's YouTube channel on June 15, 2013. An alternate music video for the song was released on February 14, 2017.

Charts

Weekly charts

Year-end charts

References

2013 singles
Shinedown songs
2012 songs
Songs written by Dave Bassett (songwriter)
Songs written by Brent Smith
Atlantic Records singles
Song recordings produced by Rob Cavallo
Songs written by Eric Bass